The PostFinance Top Scorer is awarded annually to the Swiss National League (NL) and Swiss League (SL) player who leads the league in points at the end of the regular season. The reigning Top Scorer from each team wears a yellow flame-emblazoned shirt and helmet in all playoff games. Once the qualifiers have taken place, the player with the most points in the league is then crowned the PostFinance Top Scorer of the NL or SL.

History
The award was introduced in the 2002–03 season. PostFinance's, the award's sponsor, aim is to provide the next generation of Swiss ice hockey players with direct, sustainable support. For each Top Scorer point, the youth section of the respective club receives CHF 200 (NL) and CHF 100 (SL). PostFinance also awards the same amount to the Swiss Ice Hockey Federation for its youth teams. The PostFinance Top Scorer bonus payments are earmarked and must be used exclusively to support and train junior players.

Winners
Source:

References

External links
 Information on nationalleague.ch
 The Top Scorer ranking of the NL A and B
 The purpose

Ice hockey in Switzerland
Geneve-Servette HC
Swiss awards